Andrew Mark Schwass (born 11 April 1974 in Nelson) is a former New Zealand cricketer who played for the Central Districts in the State Championship and the State Shield before retiring in 2005 due to ankle injuries. He also played for Nelson in the Hawke Cup.

References
 

1974 births
Living people
New Zealand cricketers
Central Districts cricketers
South Island cricketers
21st-century New Zealand people